Pristidactylus fasciatus, also known as d'Orbigny's banded anole, is a species of lizard endemic to Argentina.

References

fasciatus
Reptiles of Argentina
Endemic fauna of Argentina
Reptiles described in 1837
Taxa named by Alcide d'Orbigny
Taxa named by Gabriel Bibron